Ganchovets is a village in Dryanovo Municipality, Gabrovo Province, in northern central Bulgaria.

References

Villages in Gabrovo Province